The eighteenth cycle of America's Next Top Model (subtitled as America's Next Top Model: British Invasion) premiered on February 29, 2012 and was the twelfth season to air on The CW. It occupied the time slot of the final two scheduled episodes of Remodeled. This was the first American edition of Top Model to be filmed and broadcast in high definition (HD). The cycle featured fourteen contestants, placing seven British models who had competed in previous cycles of Britain's Next Top Model alongside seven all-new American models.

Fashion industry public relations maven Kelly Cutrone replaced Vogue editor André Leon Talley as a judge for the series. The rest of the judging panel remained the same.

The international destinations for this cycle were Toronto, Ontario, Canada, and the special administrative regions of Macau and Hong Kong in China. The show’s second visit to China. 

The prizes for this cycle included a modeling contract with LA Models & NY Model Management, a guest correspondent placement with Extra, a fashion spread in Vogue Italia, and both the cover and a spread in Beauty In Vogue, becoming the face of America’s Next Top Model fragrance "Dream Come True", production of a record single released by CBS Records, and a 100,000 contract with CoverGirl cosmetics.

The winner of the competition was 21-year-old British model Sophie Sumner from Oxford, England. American Model Laura LaFrate placed as the runner up. This is also the first cycle in the history of America's Next Top Model in which all three finalists made it to the top three without ever landing in the bottom two during judging.

Casting

The cycle featured seven contestants from previous cycles of Britain's Next Top Model for a second chance to win the title. Cycles 1 and 7 were both unrepresented, cycles 2, 3, 4 and 6 were each represented by one contestant, and cycle 5 was represented by three contestants. The returning contestants Britain's Next Top Model and their prior placements were:

Cast

Contestants

(Ages stated are at start of contest)

Judges
 Tyra Banks  
 Nigel Barker
 Kelly Cutrone

Episodes
No episode aired on April 4, 2012 due to the CW's broadcast of One Tree Hill series finale.

Summaries

Call-out order

 The contestant was eliminated
 The contestant quit the competition
 The contestant was part of a non-elimination bottom four
 The contestant won the competition

Bottom two

 The contestant was eliminated after their first time in the bottom two
 The contestant was eliminated after their second time in the bottom two
 The contestant was eliminated after their third time in the bottom two
 The contestant quit the competition 
 The contestant was eliminated in the final judging and placed as the runner-up

Average  call-out order
Casting call-out order and final two are not included.

Photo shoots

 Episode 1 photo shoot: American vs. British public figures
 Episode 2 photo shoot: Toddlers of Kris Jenner
 Episode 3 photo shoot: Very.com trends campaign
 Episode 4 photo shoot: Posing with British hats and American cars
 Episode 5 photo shoot: Covered in maple leaves and syrup
 Episode 6 music video: Booty Tooch group video
 Episode 7 photo shoot: Art installments at a dinner party hosted by Estelle
 Episode 8 photo shoot: Hello Kitty couture
 Episode 9 photo shoot: Wearing silk dresses with silkworms
 Episode 10 photo shoot: Harnessed on the Macau Tower
 Episode 11 photo shoot: Dream Come True perfume in a life-sized bottle
 Episode 13 photo shoot & commercial: Beauty in Vogue spread; CoverGirl Blast Flipstick commercial and print ad

Makeovers

 Mariah – Dark ombre with bangs
 Louise – Beige blunt cut
 Candace – Extra long weave
 Ashley – Strawberry blunt cut
 AzMarie – Shaved design
 Kyle – Strawberry blonde with bangs
 Seymone – Milk chocolate weave
 Catherine – Magenta pink
 Eboni – Long straight brown ombre weave with bangs
 Alisha – Shoulder length black weave with one side shaved
 Annaliese – Crazy teased weave, later; weave removed
 Laura – Platinum blonde with blue & red clip-in extensions 
 Sophie – Cotton candy pink and bleached eyebrows

Criticism
During filming, an argument took place between judge Kelly Cutrone and contestant Louise Watts, resulting in Watts voluntarily leaving the show. Following transmission of the episode, Cutrone posted mocking videos to Watts online, and came under fire from fans of the show who accused her of cyberbullying.

Trivia 

 In a 2018 Instagram post, Annaliese Dayes revealed that during the photoshoot in episode 10, where the girls were photographed on top of Macau Tower, the girls experienced “hail stones and gail force winds at 388 metres above the ground”. She also revealed that the weather was so bad, that the tower was closed “to the public due to the treacherous weather”.
Dayes revealed on Instagram that the episode 2 photoshoot that with Kris Jenner was filmed on her 25th birthday, describing the day as “one of my best and most memorable birthdays ever!”.
It was revealed that Amelia Thomas was supposed to take part as a contestant on America's Next Top Model as the eighth former BNTM Contestant. However, due to stress and other factors, Amelia withdrew before the competition aired.

Notes

America’s Next Top Model can be viewed on Hulu.

References

America's Next Top Model
2012 American television seasons
Television shows filmed in California
Television shows filmed in Toronto
Television shows filmed in Macau
Television shows filmed in Hong Kong